Baqershahr (formerly, Baqerabad (Persian: باقِر آباد), also Romanized as Bāqerābād; also known as Bāqerābād-e Bāqerof and Bāqerābād-e Bāqer of) is a city in Kahrizak District of Ray County, Tehran province, Iran. At the 2006 census, its population was 52,575 in 12,478 households. The following census in 2011 counted 59,091 people in 15,761 households. The latest census in 2016 showed a population of 65,388 people in 18,802 households.

References 

Ray County, Iran

Cities in Tehran Province

Populated places in Tehran Province

Populated places in Ray County, Iran